DNGRFLD is a studio album by American hip hop artist Prolyphic. It was released November 4, 2016 on Strange Famous Records.

Music 
The album is mostly produced by Prolyphic, with one track contributed by Matt Stine. Guest appearances include Seez Mics and Cas One.

Track listing 
All tracks are produced by Prolyphic except where noted.

References

External links 
 DNGRFLD at Bandcamp
 DNGRFLD at Discogs

Strange Famous Records albums
2016 albums
Hip hop albums by American artists